No. 1459 (Fighter) Flight was formed at RAF Hunsdon, Hertfordshire on 20 September 1941, equipped with Turbinlite Douglas Boston and Douglas Havoc aircraft. By 21 September 1941 the flight moved to RAF Hibaldstow, Lincolnshire. On operations they cooperated with the Hawker Hurricanes of 253 Squadron.

Description
1459 Flight was perhaps the most successful unit of its kind: after becoming operational in March 1942 they made their first target illumination was on 28 April 1942, but that night the satellite aircraft were not in position. Two days later Flt/Lt. C.V. Winn illuminated a He 111 which fell victim to S/Ldr. Yapp of 253 sqn. Three more contacts were made in May 1942, but all proved friendly. In July by now S/Ldr. C.V. Winn scored a probable Do 217 and P/O J.A. Gunn another Do 217 damaged. A further aircraft was claimed as damaged in August, giving a total of one destroyed, one probable and two damaged.

The flight was replaced with 538 Squadron on 2 September 1942 but officially disbanded as late as 25 January 1943. 538 Sqn, which had taken over men and machines, carried on flying the Turbinlite Bostons and Havocs till the system was abandoned on 25 January 1943, when Turbinlite squadrons were, due to lack of success on their part and the rapid development of AI radar, thought to be superfluous.

Aircraft operated

Flight bases

Commanding officers

References 
Notes

Bibliography

 Delve, Ken. The Source Book of the RAF. Shrewsbury, Shropshire, UK: Airlife Publishing, 1994. .
 Halley, James J. The Squadrons of the Royal Air Force & Commonwealth 1918-1988. Tonbridge, Kent, UK: Air Britain (Historians) Ltd., 1988. .
 Jefford, C.G. RAF Squadrons, a Comprehensive record of the Movement and Equipment of all RAF Squadrons and their Antecedents since 1912. Shrewsbury, Shropshire, UK: Airlife Publishing, 1988 (second edition 2001). .
 Lake, Alan. Flying Units of the RAF. Shrewsbury, Shropshire, UK: Airlife Publishing, 1999. .
 Rawlings, John D.R. Fighter Squadrons of the RAF and their Aircraft. London: Macdonald & Jane's (Publishers) Ltd., 1969 (2nd edition 1976, reprinted 1978). .
 Sturtivant, Ray, ISO and John Hamlin. RAF Flying Training And Support Units since 1912. Tonbridge, Kent, UK: Air-Britain (Historians) Ltd., 2007. .

External links
 Aircraft and Markings of no. 511-598 sqn, amongst them 538 sqn, the successor of 1459 flt.

1459 Flight
Military units and formations established in 1941